= Quebec Environmental Law Center =

The Quebec Environmental Law Centre (QELC; French: Le Centre québécois du droit de l'environnement, CQDE) is a non-profit environmental organization whose mission is to ensure the application of the environmental laws and the rights of citizens in environmental matters in Quebec and Canada.

The QELC was founded in 1989 by a group of lawyers interested in environmental law. The organization now regroups senior lawyers and environmental professionals who are regularly involved in important environmental debates.
